The Red Lily is a 1924 American silent drama film directed by Fred Niblo and starring Ramon Novarro, Enid Bennett, and Wallace Beery. A print of the film exists.

Plot
Marise La Noue (Enid Bennett) and Jean Leonnec (Ramon Novarro) are young lovers who elope to Paris; however, they are separated shortly after their arrival, leading to the downward spiral of both their lives: She becomes a prostitute known as 'the Red Lily', and he learns the ways of the underworld from Bo-Bo (Wallace Beery).

Cast
 Ramon Novarro as Jean Leonnec
 Enid Bennett as Marise La Noue
 Frank Currier as Hugo Leonnec
 Mitchell Lewis as D'Agut
 Rosita Marstini as Madame Charpied (as Risita Marstini)
 Sidney Franklin as M. Charpied - Her Husband
 Wallace Beery as Bo-Bo
 George Nichols as Concierge
 Emily Fitzroy as Mama Bouchard
 George Periolat as Papa Bouchard
 Rosemary Theby as Nana
 Milla Davenport as Madame Poussot
 Gibson Gowland as Le Turc
 Dick Sutherland as The Toad
 Marcelle Corday as Woman in bar (uncredited)

Censorship concerns
The film industry created the National Association of the Motion Picture Industry in 1916 in an effort to preempt censorship by states and municipalities, and it used a list of subjects called the "Thirteen Points" which film plots were to avoid. However, prostitution was not explicitly barred so long as it was not forcible (i.e., white slavery), and aspects of the prostitute’s work were not present in the film.

References

External links

1924 films
1924 drama films
Silent American drama films
American silent feature films
American black-and-white films
Films directed by Fred Niblo
Films with screenplays by Bess Meredyth
Metro-Goldwyn-Mayer films
Surviving American silent films
1920s American films